Rhyphonemognatha is a genus of blister beetles in the family Meloidae. There is one described species in Rhyphonemognatha, R. rufa.

References

Further reading

 
 

Meloidae
Articles created by Qbugbot